William Willis (born 1943) is an American abstract painter.

Biography
Willis was born in 1943 in Sheffield, Alabama. He lives on the coast of Maryland, and works in Washington, D.C. He usually makes paintings and works on paper in muted colors as abstractions of the natural world. Eastern philosophy and religion influenced his work in the 1980s. In Washington, D.C., Willis exhibited a dozen years of his work at the Phillips Collection in 1989 and also taught at the Corcoran School of Art.

Education
Willis received a BA in studio art and an MFA in painting from the University of South Florida, Tampa. In 2010 he was appointed to a five-year professorship as William S. Morris Eminent Scholar in Art at Augusta State University.

Recognition
He has received awards and grants from organizations including the National Endowment for the Arts, the Vermont Studio Center, the Pollock-Krasner Foundation, the Southeastern Center for Contemporary Art, the University of Maryland, and the Maryland State Arts Council.

Notes

References
Frankel, David. "William Willis: Howard Scott Gallery." , Artforum, New York, October 2001. Retrieved on 13 June 2012.
"Full-Time Art Faculty." , Augusta State University Department of Art, Augusta, GA, 2011. Retrieved on 13 June 2012.
Moore, Margaret. "On the Cover: William Willis, painter." "Hemisphere", September, 2004. Print.
Protzman, Ferdinand. "William Willis: Abstract and Real." "The Washington Post", Washington, DC, 12 October 2000. Print.
"William Willis." , Vermont Studio Center, Johnson, Vermont, October 2010. Retrieved on 13 June 2012.
"William Willis (1943 -)." , AskART, 2012. Retrieved on 13 June 2012.
"William Willis: Paintings and Drawings." , Gertrude Herbert Institute of Art, Augusta, GA, 21 October 2011. Retrieved on 13 June 2012.

American abstract artists
20th-century American painters
American male painters
21st-century American painters
1943 births
Living people
Painters from Washington, D.C.
Painters from Alabama
People from Sheffield, Alabama
20th-century American male artists